Pen Bonc Hill is a summit located in Central New York Region of New York located in the Town of Floyd in Oneida County, north-northwest of Holland Patent.

References

Mountains of Oneida County, New York
Mountains of New York (state)